Ranganna is a 1997, Indian Kannada-language romantic action film written and directed by H. Vasu. The film stars Jaggesh as an auto driver, Ranga, who tries to mend the broken relationship of his uncle with the help of Roopa by reuniting him with his stubborn wife who happens to be Roopa's mother. Vijayalakshmi plays Ranga's love interest, Roopa. Srinath, Kavitha, Dheerendra Gopal and Loknath essayed other important roles. Rajesh Ramanath composed the soundtrack whileJ. G. Krishna handled the cinematography.

The film marks the first collaboration of director H. Vasu with music director Rajesh Ramanath and second collaboration with Jaggesh and producer Sa Ra Govindaraju after Bhanda Alla Bahaddur which was released in the same year.

The film received a U certificate from the CBFC without any cuts on 7 October 1997. Sri Ganesh Videos acquired the video rights and released and marketed the film in VCD and DVD formats.

Cast 
 Jaggesh
 Vijayalakshmi
 Srinath
 Kavitha
 Loknath
 Dheerendra Gopal
 Harish Rai
 Honnavalli Krishna
 Bank Janardhan
 M. S. Karanth

Soundtrack 

The soundtrack album comprises 5 songs composed by Rajesh Ramanath. The audio rights of the film was sold to Lahari Music.

 Auto Auto — sung by S. P. Balasubrahmanyam ; lyrics by S. R. Shastry
 Bandlu Bandlu — sung by Rajesh Krishnan and Soumya ; lyrics by Shyamsundar Kulkarni
 Baaro Baaro — sung by Rajesh Krishnan and K. S. Chithra ; lyrics by Doddarange Gowda
 Mangoli Mangol — sung by Rajesh Krishnan and Soumya ; lyrics by K. Kalyan
 Aajare Aaja — sung by Rajesh Krishnan and K. S. Chithra ; lyrics by Sri Ranga

References

External links 
 Ranganna at Gaana

1997 films
1990s Kannada-language films